Arlind Sejdiu (born 11 August 2001) is a professional footballer who plays as an left winger for Finnish club Lahti. Born in Finland, he represents Kosovo at under-21 international level.

Club career
On 7 September 2020, Sejdiu joined Veikkausliiga side Lahti. Two days later, he made his debut in a 2–2 away draw against IFK Mariehamn after coming on as a substitute at 71st minute in place of Eemeli Virta.

International career
Sejdiu represented Finland at youth international level, part of the under-17, under-18, and under-19 teams.

On 3 November 2021, he received a call-up from Kosovo under-21 team for the 2023 UEFA European Under-21 Championship qualification match against Albania U21. His debut with Kosovo under-21 came thirteen days later after coming on as a substitute at 62nd minute in place of Valmir Veliu, scoring his side's second goal during a 2–1 home win.

Personal life
Sejdiu was born in Oulu, Finland to Kosovo Albanian parents from Mitrovica, he is the nephew of Kosovan football coach and former player Gani Sejdiu.

References

2001 births
Living people
Sportspeople from Oulu
Association football wingers
Finnish footballers
Finland youth international footballers
Finnish people of Kosovan descent
Finnish people of Albanian descent
Kosovan footballers
Kosovo under-21 international footballers
Kakkonen players
Pallohonka players
Veikkausliiga players
FC Honka players
FC Lahti players